The Himalayan (short for Himalayan Persian, or Colourpoint Persian as it is commonly referred to in Europe), is a breed or sub-breed of long-haired cat similar in type to the Persian, with the exception of its blue eyes and its point colouration, which were derived from crossing the Persian with the Siamese. Some registries may classify the Himalayan as a long-haired sub-breed of Siamese, or a colorpoint sub-breed of Persian. The World Cat Federation has merged them with the Colorpoint Shorthair and Javanese into a single breed, the Colorpoint.

History
There is little or no information from the literature or early pictorial representations to indicate how ancient the four main groups of cats are; these being the two varieties of tabby, the single coloured black or white, and the sex-linked orange (marmalade or tortoiseshell cats). In addition, there are other breeds of cat that are more closely controlled by humans, such as the Manx, the Persian, Siamese, and Abyssinian, to name but a few.

The Cat Fanciers' Association considers the Himalayan Persian simply a color variation of the Persian rather than a separate breed, although they do compete in their own color division. It was for the color that the breed was named "Himalayan": a reference to the coloration of Himalayan animals, in particular the Himalayan rabbit.  It has been suggested that the Persian long-haired cats are descended from Pallas's cat, Felis manul, a wild cat that inhabits central Asia and which is unmarked with spots or stripes and has very long soft fur. There is, however, no osteological or other evidence for this and it is more likely that the long-haired domestic cats are the result of artificial selection for this characteristic by humans.

Tests are still being done to discover the ancestors of cats such as Himalayans. An example of this research and experimentation is in that of the following: A rare color variant of the American mink (Neogale vison), discovered on a ranch in Nova Scotia and referred to as the ‘‘marbled’’ variety, carries a distinctive pigment distribution pattern resembling that found in some other species, e.g., the Siamese cat and the Himalayan mouse.

Work to formally establish a breed with combined Persian and Siamese traits, explicitly for the cat fancy, began in the United States in the 1930s at Harvard University, under the term Siamese–Persian, and the results were published in the Journal of Heredity in 1936, but were not adopted as a recognized breed by any major fancier groups at the time.  Brian Sterling-Webb independently developed the cross-breed over a period of ten years in the UK, and in 1955 it was recognized there as the Longhaired Colourpoint by the Governing Council of the Cat Fancy (GCCF).

California cat breeder Jean Mill took a series of graduate classes in genetics at the University of California, Davis. By 1948, she was one of three breeders independently crossing the Persian and Siamese to create the Himalayan cat.

Separate US-based breeding efforts had begun around 1950, and a breeder known to sources simply as Mrs. Goforth received breed recognition from the Cat Fanciers' Association (CFA) near the end of 1957 for the Himalayan.  Early breeders were mostly interested in adding Siamese colouration to long-haired cats, and therefore reinforced the stock by outbreeding to Persians only to retain the Persian trait dominance.  However, by the 1960s, some were re-introducing Siamese stock and producing less "Persian-style" cats, In the 1980s, a concerted effort to re-establish the breed along more formally Persian lines ultimately caused the breed to be merged into Persian as a variant in some registries (e.g. in 1984 by CFA), and a decline in the "old" or Siamese-like specimens.

Appearance

Body
Like Persians more generally, the Himalayan tends to have a round (cobby) body and short legs, which makes it harder for them to jump as high as other cats do. Since the 1960s, however, some have more of a Siamese-like body, and thus do not have this limitation, but may not be acceptable as show cats, depending on the specific breed standards of the organisation in question.

Head
As with other Persians, there are two types of Himalayans, the traditional or doll-face, and the peke-faced or ultra-typed which has the more extreme squashed-looking facial features.  The seal-point Himalayan in the photo to the left is doll-faced while the red(flame)-point in the title image is peke-faced.

Show Himalayans display a nose break as do peke-faced Persians, and have very large, round eyes with the nose leather directly between the eyes. Breeder or pet Himalayans generally have longer noses than the show cats, and may display a longer muzzle and smaller eyes than the show cats do. All three types of cat are Himalayans, however.

Coat
Blue point: An off-white coat with gray points: the feet, ears, tail, and face mask.
Lilac Point: A coat that’s similar to a blue, but instead of gray, the points are a purplish light-brown. 
Seal Point: A coat with black or dark-gray points.
Chocolate Point: A coat with rich brown points. 
Red or Flame Point: If both parent cats are dilutes (blue, cream, or blue-cream), the offspring cannot be a flame-point.
Cream Point: Flame and cream colors can be very close. There are hot creams and light reds. Body-color is whiter and brighter than on a seal-point cat.

The bulk of the fur on the body of a Himalayan is white or cream, but the points come in many different colors: Seal (or Black), Blue, Lilac, Chocolate, Red (Flame), and Cream. The points can also be Tabby, Lynx, or Tortoiseshell-patterned.

The Chocolate and Lilac point Himalayans are the most difficult to produce, because both parents must carry the gene for Chocolate/Lilac to produce a Chocolate or Lilac kitten, as the trait is autosomal recessive.

Health
Due to their Persian ancestry, some Himalayans may have the gene that causes Polycystic kidney disease, (PKD); however, a genetic test can reveal which cats carry the PKD gene, so that they may be spayed or neutered.

Like many long-haired cats, Himalayans need to be brushed daily to keep their coats looking their best and healthiest.  In addition, they may need their face wiped daily, depending on the cat. Bathing a Himalayan is also recommended by some breeders, to help reduce the amount of oil on the cat's fur and skin.

In popular culture
In the 1984 Heathcliff cartoon TV series, the character Hector (voiced by Danny Mann) is a brown Himalayan with a purple tie, a grey headband, a 1980s hairstyle, and a New Jersey accent.
In the CBS television detective series "Tucker's Witch" (1982), a Himalayan cat named Dickens is the familiar to witch Amanda Tucker.  Amanda Tucker has a telepathic link with Dickens, who provides her and her husband with clairvoyant clues to help them solve mysteries. Dickens is featured prominently in the show's opening and closing credits.
In the spoof film Date Movie (2006), Mr. Jinxers is a parody of his Meet the Parents counterpart.
In the movies Homeward Bound: The Incredible Journey (1993) and Homeward Bound II: Lost in San Francisco (1996), one of the main characters is a Himalayan cat named Sassy (voiced by Sally Field).
The main character of the anime/manga Prince of Tennis, Ryoma Echizen, owns a playful, mischievous and surprisingly smart Himalayan cat named Karupin (or Kalpin in the English translation), to whom he's very attached.
In the popular Korean drama Couple or Trouble the main character, Anna Jo, owns a million-dollar Himalayan cat named Princess who is featured in every episode, from being pampered by Anna Jo to appearing in another characters' nightmares.
Martha Stewart owns three Himalayans, named after composers: Beethoven, Mozart and Bartók. The cats have been featured in her commercials for Kmart, on her television show, Martha Stewart Living, and in her magazine, such as the cover of the February 1999 issue.
Webkinz, an online game where characters can play with the plush pets they have purchased, has a Himalayan as one of their stuffed animals.
In Flipping Out, Jeff Lewis's two Himalayan cats, Monkey and Stewie, are often featured.
In the TV series iCarly, in the episode "iMove Out", the cat Harmoo, a Himalayan cat, plays a part.
A Himalayan named Goma and his blog was featured in the Animal Planet show Cats 101 in 2009.
A Himalayan named Luna The Fashion Kitty became a social media phenomenon in 2011 with a popular Facebook page, a website, and many media references.
A Himalayan-Persian named Colonel Meow became an Internet celebrity in 2012, and entered Guinness World Records 2014 as the cat with the longest fur.
Mr. Jinx (also known as Jinxy, or simply just Jinx) from the Meet the Parents trilogy is a seal-point peke-faced Himalayan with an all-black tail.
The "narrator" of David Michie's series of books that begins with "The Dalai Lama's Cat" is a Himalayan cat.

Gallery

References

External links

 Himalayan Cat Breed
 Himalayan-Persian CFA Breed Article
 

Cat breeds
Cat breeds originating in the United States